Edna Cooke Shoemaker (1889–1975) was an American artist and illustrator. Born in Philadelphia, she graduated from the Philadelphia High School for Girls in 1908 and was a student at the Philadelphia Academy of Art. She illustrated magazine advertisements, magazine covers including Ladies Home Journal (April 1920, June 1920, and August 1920); and Etude (October 1928); and children's books including Mother Goose, Heidi, Hans Brinker, Tommy Tip Toe, Stories of Mrs. Moleworth, Stories by Juliana Horatia Ewing, and East o’ the Sun, West o’ the Moon.

References 

American illustrators
American women illustrators
1889 births
1975 deaths